Crowd Control may mean:
 Crowd control, controlling large groups of people
 Crowd control (video games), handling interactions of many objects and mobs in a video game
 Crowd Control (TV series), a 2014 TV show on the National Geographic Channel
 "Crowd Control" (song), a 2017 song by Dimitri Vegas & Like Mike and W&W